The surname Netto may refer to:

 Adevaldo Virgílio Netto (born 1943), Brazilian footballer
 Adolpho Araújo Netto (born 1984), Brazilian footballer
 Andrei Netto (born 1977), Brazilian journalist and writer
 Antônio Carbonari Netto, Brazilian educator, mathematician, and businessman
 Antônio Delfim Netto (born 1928), Brazilian economist and politician
 Antonio Ferreira Batalha Silva-Netto (1876–1962), Hong Kong Macanese businessman
 Antônio Gonzaga Netto, Brazilian footballer and manager
 Benjamin Silva-Netto (born 1939), Filipino long-distance runner
 Carlos Javier Netto (born 1970), Argentine footballer
 Chico Netto (Francisco Bueno Netto, 1894–1959), Brazilian footballer
 Clairton Netto (born 1998), Brazilian footballer
 Curt Netto (1847–1909), German metallurgist and educator
 Daniel Kozelinski Netto (born 1952), Brazilian theologian
 Eugen Netto (1848–1919), German mathematician
 Fábio Roberto Gomes Netto (born 1997), Brazilian footballer
 Francisco Correa Netto (born 17th century), Portuguese sexton
 Hadrian Maria Netto (1885–1947), German stage and film actor
 Hermógenes Netto (born 1913), Brazilian cyclist
 Igor Netto (1930–1999), Soviet footballer
 Irena Netto (1899–1992), Polish actress
 José Luiz Olaio Netto,  Brazilian basketball player
 Ladislau de Souza Mello Netto (1838–1894), Brazilian botanist
 Leandro Netto de Macedo (born 1979), Brazilian footballer
 Leonardo Gonçalves Martins Netto (born 1989), Brazilian footballer
 Loz Netto, member of British rock band Sniff 'n' the Tears
 Luisinho Netto (born 1974), Brazilian footballer
 Nalini Netto (born 1957), Indian officer
 Rodrigo Netto (1977–2006), Brazilian musician
 Ruan Tressoldi Netto (born 1999), Brazilian footballer
 Ruy Netto (born 1980), Brazilian footballer
 Sebastião do Rego Barros Netto (1940–2015), Brazilian lawyer and diplomat
 Uwe Siemon-Netto, (born 1936), German theologian and journalist
 Walter Souza Braga Netto (born 1957), Brazilian army general and Minister of Defence

See also
Neto (suffix)